The Ooni of Ile-Ife (Ọọ̀ni of Ilè-Ifẹ̀) is the traditional ruler of Ile-Ife and the spiritual head of the Yoruba people. The Ooni dynasty existed before the reign of Oduduwa which historians have argued to have been between the 7th-9th centuries A.D.

After the demise of Oduduwa and Ogun’s loss of the throne,  Oduduwa's support base dispersed out of Ile-Ife. Another account but not in tandem with existing evidences states that Ogun purposely sent all Oduduwa's children on different journeys to effect Yoruba territory expansion.

Whatever the case, after Oduduwa’s short reign, Obatala re-emerged as the king of Ile-Ife and the throne was rotated between Obatala and Obalufon houses until the return of Oranmiyan who briefly interrupted the succession pattern. Popular history as associated Ooni Lajamisan with Oranmiyan as his son. However, Ife tradition shows that Lajamisan was indeed a descent of Oranfe lineage. Nevertheless, Lajamisan is often said to have opened the modern Ife history.

Prior to the 20th century, the succession pattern of the Ooni was fluid. However, with the modernity that came with colonialism, the succession pattern was structured to the existing four actual Ruling Houses are named from Ooni Lafogido, Ooni Osinkola, Ooni Ogboru and Ooni Giesi. The structure has been heavily critiqued for being influenced by politics, personal vendetta and obfuscation of history. For instance, while the first three were said to have been sons of Ooni Lajodogun, certain figures regarded as siblings of Ogboru have either been completely excluded or subsumed. The current Ooni is Adeyeye Enitan Ogunwusi Ojaja II (born October 17, 1974).

Various authors have various lists
The primary sources for the history of the Yoruba are from oral tradition. The oral traditions of Ile-Ife indicate that Oranfe was an Olofin and likewise Obatala who is credited with the ownership of the Are (the Ife crown). Since there were not ceremonial recitations of the list of the Oonis (at burial or at crowning), there are in fact several oral traditions, that have generated an unusual number of different written transcriptions. In what follows, #nn is the index of the Ooni in the A list (see table, column LA). Nevertheless, the existing literature have excised Oranfe and Obatala from the lists of the rulers of Ile-Ife.

Books and research papers
 Ojo Bada 1954 quotes 15 names for the Oduduwa to Lajamisan period. See column 5.
 Chief Fabunmi 1975 quotes 7 names for the same period. See column 6.  Chief Fabunmi is known for his Historical notes. 

 Chief Fasogbon 1976 quotes 12 names for this period. See column 7.
 Chief Awosemo 1985 quotes 22 names from Oduduwa to Giesi. See column 8.
 Eluyemi 1986 quotes 41 names from Oduduwa to nowadays. See column 9.   

Sources for the 50 items A list

  Awoyinfa, Dele, 1992  pages 30–35.
  Prince L. A. Adetunji 1999, pages 70–77. The prince, from the Giesi family, was one of the contenders for the 2015 designation. See column LA.

Sources for the 50 items B list
 Ologundu 2008, pages 58–59.  Lists 48 names, that are the B list, except from Obalufon Alayemore (#5) and Aworokolokin (#12). Moreover, Osinkola (#18) is at #25 (strange place)  Araba Adedayo Ologundu was a native of Ile-Ife, Nigeria. See column Og. 
 Lawal 2000, page 21 (nevertheless, this book is Google described as a 19 pages book !). See column LB.

Web sources
 Source 2015.
 Leadership.ng 2015., 2015. No references are given. One typo: Ademiluyi Ajagun (1930-19800).
 Ooni Ojaja II web site, 2016 quotes 51 names. Same as list B, differs only by the diacritics. No references are given. This list was already in use before 2015.

Influence on king making
The filling of the stool of a deceased Ooni of Ife is not a simple local affair as it may seem but has national ramifications. Since Ife is regarded as the cradle of the Yoruba, this town has always been the leading religious center of the Yoruba people. But other roles are also involved. Especially, the Ooni of Ife is often presented as the highest ranked Oba or, even more, as the natural chairman of the Council of Yoruban Chiefs.
The rules to fill a vacant stool are the Chiefs Law Cap 25 Laws of Osun State (modified 2002). And the Declaration made in 1980 by the traditional Chiefs under Section 4(2) of this Chief Law. In 1957, the former Declaration recognised four ruling houses and established the following order of rotation: 
 The Oshinkola House, Iremo (present) [as of 1957] 
 The Ogboru House, Ilare 
 The Giesi House, More 
The Lafogido House, Okerewe

In 1977, references to locations in Ife were suppressed. And the January 1980 Declaration confirmed everything just before the death of Adesoji Aderemi. These families are tagged in column desc, as sourced from Vanguard for Lafog, Osink, Ogbor, Giesi. And Newz for the rest. (Both sources don't give their own sources).

In 2015, it was the turn of the Giesi Family, as confirmed by the Ife kingmakers.  Nevertheless:
 Olakunle Aderemi (leader of Osinkola) said that, despite having produced Adesoji Aderemi (1930-1980),  Osinkola house deserved to produce the new King because the family produced the fewest of the Ooni among the four ruling houses. Ife Chieftaincy Declaration of 1980 technically throws open the contest for filling the stool of Ooni, he added. 
 The Lafogido house went to court, describing the Chieftaincy Declaration as unfair. Lafogido house had been constantly marginalized in chieftaincy reviews in Ife since 1957 they said. 14 Oonis have been enthroned from Lajodogun and only 8 from Lafogido ruling house they added.
 Adetowo Aderemi (of Osinkola) got even further, faulting the 1957 and 1980 Ife Traditional Council Declarations, describing them as a fraud. That they are against the customary law of succession of the Ife people, he said. He also faulted the inclusion of Giesi Ruling House among eligible royal families to fill the stool of Ooni, saying that Giesi was only invited to complete the term of Ogboru, not being from the male lineage with right to the stool as the grandson of Ogboru.

Finally, Adeyeye Enitan Ogunwusi, from the Giesi house, was elected October 26, 2015.

Avoiding original research when consolidating the various lists

Consolidation at the price of the diacritics 

The Yoruba language is written nowadays with an alphabet that uses many diacritic signs. But this alphabet was not strictly codified before being integrated as one of the components of the modern Pan-Nigerian alphabet (1981). Like for the McCune–Reischauer system for Korean, many authors of the West have used this alphabet with some laziness, omitting many of the diacritics for various reasons, or even ignoring all of them. But, while poor romanizations of Korean can be fixed by comparing with the hangul/hanja original text, this cannot be done with the Yoruba oral sources of the past. The romanizations of the proper nouns became dependent the pronunciation of a specific speaker and the skill of a specific transcriber, leading to large variations in spelling. Some examples are (diacritics removed):

Also note that, in the aggregated table, differences that clearly come only from pronunciation have been ignored.

Consolidation at the price of the obvious discrepancies

Typographic issues 
Printing fixes everything, even the typographic issues.
 The two printed quotations of the printed Ojo Bada have discrepancies: Otaataa=Otasasa, Arirereokewe=Arirekewe, Lajamusan=Lajamisan.
  When Awosemo 1985 (quoted by  Sina Ojuade) says Giesi before Ogboruu, this is probably a typo. Indeed, all other sources are saying that Ogboruu #23 was the maternal grand father of Giesi #24.
 The quotation of Ademakinwa (p158) uses Kworokolokun: this is probably Aworokolokun.
 In column x86, Lagunja is repeated. How to correct ?
 Perhaps Ologundu 2008 ranging Osinkola #18 at place #25 is also a typo ?

Remaining discrepancies 
 In list A, Lajamisan is ranked #11. This can be tracked to the 1973 Daily Sketch kinglist (p158). This is strange since a list from start to Lajamisan should end by Lajamisan. Moving this one just before Otujabiojo #17 would synchronize the ordering of all the kinglists from Oduduwa to Lajamisan. This should be checked in detail.
 While list A sources put both Aworokolokin and Ajuimuda Ekun before Lajamisan,  most of the list B sources are saying that Aworokolokin, Ajuimuda and Ekun were three descendants of Lajodoogun. We can only  underline the discrepancy. Moreover, Ologundu don't quote Aworokolokin at all in his lists. (green in the table).
 The same occurs with the only woman that became Ooni. Most of the time, she is quoted as "Luwoo Gbagida" #18 and placed before Lajodogun #19. But also as "Luwo (Female)" and placed after Giesi #24. (green in the table).
 Efon Ayioye #6 in Awoyinfa is quite surely the same person as "Ayioye" in Bada and Fasogbon. But they are not ranked the same by the sources relatively to Ajimuda Ekun #7. Perhaps this was the reason of the comment no matter how ripe the okra is, it cannot be older than itself.
 9 names aren't part of list A or list B.

"At least, it can be said that the existence of numerous variants requires explanation, and an interpretation can be assessed according to how satisfactorily it accounts for their existence.  The method might be described as one of reductio ad non absurdum."

Aggregated list

Further reading 
  (not read)

References

Ife Rulers
 
Ife Rulers